Debra Monk (born February 27, 1949) is an American actress, singer, and writer, best known for her performances on the Broadway stage. She earned her first Tony Award for the 1993 production of Redwood Curtain and won an Emmy Award for several guest appearances on NYPD Blue between 1998 and 1999.

Life and career
Monk was born in Middletown, Ohio on February 27, 1949. She was voted "Best Personality" by her graduating class at Wheaton High School in Silver Spring, Maryland.  In 1973, she graduated from Frostburg  State University. In 1975, Monk was awarded a Master of Fine Arts from  Southern Methodist University in Dallas, Texas.

Monk garnered first attention in theatrical circles as one of the co-writers and co-stars of the musical Pump Boys and Dinettes (1982). She won the Tony Award for Best Featured Actress in a Play for performance in Redwood Curtain (1993). She was nominated for a Tony Award for roles in Picnic (1994), Steel Pier (1997), and Curtains (2007). In 2000, she won an Obie Award for The Time of the Cuckoo.  She returned to the stage in Steppenwolf Theatre Company's production of Visiting Edna by David Rabe in September 2016.

Monk appeared on the Food Channel cooking show Barefoot Contessa, where she cooked Roasted Chicken, Arugula and Bread Salad, and Tri-Berry Crumble.

Monk has appeared in over 30 films since the early 1990s. She made her film debut in the movie version of Prelude to a Kiss, playing Aunt Dorothy. She later appeared in The Bridges of Madison County (1995) and The Devil's Advocate (1997). On television, she has won a Primetime Emmy Award for Outstanding Guest Actress in a Drama Series for a recurring role as Katie Sipowicz in the ABC series, NYPD Blue. She also guest-starred on Law & Order, Desperate Housewives, The Closer, and Girls. Monk had recurring roles in A Nero Wolfe Mystery (2001-02), Grey's Anatomy (2006-11), and Damages (2007-12).

Filmography

Film

Television

Stage

Broadway
 Pump Boys and Dinettes - 1982 (also co-author and co-director)
 Prelude to a Kiss - 1990
 Nick & Nora - 1991
 Redwood Curtain - 1993 - Tony Award
 Picnic - 1994 - Tony Award nomination
 Company - 1995
 Steel Pier - 1997 - Tony Award nomination
 Ah, Wilderness! - 1998
 Thou Shalt Not - 2001
 Chicago - 2005
 Curtains - 2007 - Tony Award nomination
 Cat on a Hot Tin Roof - 2012

Off-Broadway
 The Time of the Cuckoo - Obie Award
 Ancestral Voices
 The Seagull
 Death Defying Acts
 Three Hotels
 Oil City Symphony - 1986 (co-author, Drama Desk Award)
 Assassins - 1990

References

External links
 
 
  (archive)
 Star File: Debra Monk at Broadway.com
 
 

1949 births
Living people
20th-century American actresses
21st-century American actresses
Actresses from Maryland
Actresses from Ohio
American film actresses
American musical theatre actresses
American stage actresses
American television actresses
Tony Award winners
Primetime Emmy Award winners
Drama Desk Award winners
Obie Award recipients
People from Middletown, Ohio
People from Silver Spring, Maryland
Frostburg State University alumni
Southern Methodist University alumni